Joel Toby Senior (born 24 June 1999) is an English professional footballer who plays for Carlisle United as a right back.

Early and personal life
Senior was born in Didsbury. His brothers are also footballers, who played in non-league for Maine Road.

Career
Senior spent nearly a decade with Oldham Athletic, but was released at the age of 15 for being too small. He said it was the worst day of his life. He began playing non-league football around Greater Manchester, initially with Sunday league team Hough End. At the age of 16 he was playing for Maine Road and working two days a week in an engineering and design company. He then made 68 appearances in all competitions for F.C. United of Manchester, including 58 league appearances, before moving to Curzon Ashton in February 2019, for whom he made ten league appearances in National League North.

In May 2019 he signed a 12-month contract with Premier League club Burnley, with the option of a further year, with the intention that he would initially play with their under-23 team.

He was released by Burnley at the end of the 2019–20 season. He later signed for Altrincham. He signed for Carlisle United in January 2022.

References

1999 births
Living people
English footballers
Association football fullbacks
Oldham Athletic A.F.C. players
Maine Road F.C. players
F.C. United of Manchester players
Curzon Ashton F.C. players
Burnley F.C. players
Altrincham F.C. players
Carlisle United F.C. players
North West Counties Football League players
National League (English football) players
English Football League players